María Antonieta Cámpoli Prisco (born October 9, 1955 in Italy) is an Italian-Venezuelan pageant titleholder, who was Miss Venezuela in 1972.

Biography
Maria Antonietta Cámpoli was born in Isola del Liri (an ancient city of Latium, located nearly 100 km south of Rome) in 1955, but after 3 years her family moved to live in Caracas where she grew. At the age of just 17 she was elected Miss Venezuela. But there was a huge scandal when her age was officially known, because by law she was not allowed to participate being less than 18 years old ("menor de edad") and additionally she was not born in Venezuela. It was the president Rafael Caldera who allowed her to maintain the title arguing even that she was "Venezuelan by birth", because she had moved to Venezuela when she was less than five years old. She later went to Puerto Rico as Miss Venezuela in the Miss Universe of the same year.

She is the Miss Venezuela titleholder for 1972, and was the official representative of Venezuela to the Miss Universe 1972 pageant held in Dorado, Puerto Rico, on July 29, 1972; when she won the title of 2nd runner up.

Maria Antonietta Campoli graduated as architect and married two times.  From the second husband she had a daughter, Maria Mercedes.

See also
 Italo-venezuelans

References

External links
Miss Venezuela Official Website
Miss Universe Official Website

1955 births
Italian emigrants to Venezuela
Living people
Miss Universe 1972 contestants
Miss Venezuela winners
People from Caracas
People from Isola del Liri